Chrysallida angusta is a species of sea snail, a marine gastropod mollusk in the family Pyramidellidae, the pyrams and their allies.

References

 Landau B.M. & LaFollette P.I. (2015). The Pyramidellidae (Mollusca: Gastropoda) from the Miocene Cantaure Formation of Venezuela. Cainozoic Research. 15(1-2): 13-54.

External links
 To USNM Invertebrate Zoology Mollusca Collection
 To USNM Invertebrate Zoology Mollusca Collection
 To World Register of Marine Species

angusta
Gastropods described in 1864